The 2007–08 BBL season, the 21st since the establishment of the British Basketball League, commenced on 9 September 2007, when the Plymouth Raiders succumbed to the Guildford Heat in the inaugural Cup Winners' Cup competition. The regular season started two weeks later on 21 September with 12 teams including new additions Birmingham Panthers, Everton Tigers and London Capital the later of whom stepped up from EBL Division 1 during the summer. After just one season in the top-flight, London United were forced to drop out due to the loss of its financial backer just weeks before the start of the season.

Guildford's participation in the ULEB Cup saw a British team return to European competition for the first time since Brighton Bears' appearance in the same competition in the 2003–04 season. Out of their depth, the Heat finished their European adventure with a 0–10 record.

On the domestic scene Guildford continued their dominance, collecting the Cup Winners' Cup, BBL Trophy and the Play-off crown. Newcastle Eagles were Champions of the League's regular season campaign, whilst rookie teams Everton and London ended with respectable 7th and 9th-place finishes. The League also secured a live broadcasting contract with Setanta Sports midway through the campaign which saw one televised game a week screened on live on their network.

Teams

Notable occurrences 
 The league features three new teams, the Birmingham Panthers and Everton Tigers, both start-up franchises, and London Capital, who stepped up from the English Basketball League.
 Just two weeks before the start of the season, London United's directors announced on 5 September that they have withdrawn from all competitions for the upcoming season because of financial difficulties, leaving new team Capital as London's sole representatives.
 A new pre-season competition, the Cup Winners' Cup, a two-legged face-off between the current holders of the BBL Cup and the BBL Trophy, opened the new season, with Guildford Heat claiming a 176-168 aggregate win over Plymouth Raiders.
 On 2 October, just days before their inaugural home game, Birmingham Panthers finally secured a deal with the University of Wolverhampton, to use their Walsall Campus as a home venue. This came after deals with two other venues had previously fallen through, and the League rejected a proposal for relocation to Telford.
 Guildford made their debut in European competition (ULEB Cup) on 6 November, just two years after they ere established. They lost 84–68 away to Bosnian team KK Bosna in Sarajevo.
 During the early hours of 10 November, Guildford star Brian Dux was involved in a serious car accident and fell into a coma. He was finally rushed to hospital over two hours after his car was found, and put into immediate intensive care.
 The BBL Cup Final took place at the National Indoor Arena, in Birmingham, on 13 January 2008. A sell-out crowd of over 6,000 people saw a valiant Milton Keynes Lions comeback over Newcastle Eagles to claim their first ever piece of silverware, with a 69–66 victory.
 A television deal was struck on 17 February with international broadcaster Setanta Sports which began with the 2008 Trophy Final and saw one game a week shown live on Setanta Sports 2 every Wednesday.
 Despite having an earlier attempt to relocate to Telford blocked by the BBL, Birmingham Panthers played their first game at Telford's TCAT Arena on 17 February against Newcastle Eagles, who stormed to a 59–104 victory. The temporary move suggested the franchise may relocate to Telford after just one season in Birmingham.
 Guildford triumphed with their first ever BBL Trophy victory over Newcastle at the Plymouth Pavilions on 2 March. In front of a sell-out crowd and broadcast live on Setanta Sports 2, the Heat ran out 86-79 winners in the action-packed final.

BBL Championship (Tier 1)

Final standings

The play-offs

Quarter-finals

Semi-finals

Third-place game

Final

National League Division 1 (Tier 2)

Final standings

National League Division 2 (Tier 3)

Final standings

Cup Winners' Cup 
The 2007–08 season saw the inauguration of the BBL's newest competition, the Cup Winners' Cup. The pre-season event between last season's winners of the BBL Cup and BBL Trophy was staged over two legs with the winner determined by the final aggregate score.

Guildford Heat claimed the upper-hand in the first leg away to Plymouth Raiders with an 83–77 victory, despite being ahead by 18-points, Raiders kept fighting and eventually clawed the game back before losing in the final minutes.

The second leg in Guildford was an equally tight affair, but Heat's strength combined with Raiders' poor free-throw shooting, gave them a 93–91 victory, tallying up to a 176–168 win on aggregate.

BBL Cup 

For the 2007–08 edition of the BBL Cup, the top three ranking teams from last season's BBL Championship – Guildford Heat, Sheffield Sharks and Newcastle Eagles – plus the Milton Keynes Lions, all received a bye into the Quarter-final, leaving the remaining eight clubs to battle it out in the First Round.

First round

Quarter-finals

Semi-finals

Final

BBL Trophy 

This season's BBL Trophy was slightly reformatted from the previous edition of the tournament. The first round comprised three groups of three and one group of four. Gone were the lower league clubs for the English Basketball League and Scottish Basketball League, with the exception of the previous year's EBL Division 1 champions Worthing Thunder, who stepped in to fill the spot vacated by London United, who withdrew prior to the season opener.

Each team played each other twice, once home and once away, and after each group campaign is completed, the top team from each group advanced into the semi-finals. If teams tied on points (2 for a win, 0 for a loss), head-to-head results would come into play.

Group stage 
Group 1

Group 2

Group 3

Group 4

Semi-finals

Final 
The Final for this season's BBL Trophy was held on 2 March 2008, at the Pavilions in Plymouth, the first time the venue has hosted a major final. It was a 'North-South' final contested between Newcastle Eagles and Guildford Heat, and was broadcast live on television, on Setanta Sports 2, and also BBC Radio Newcastle.

Newcastle had been leading 47–35 at the half, but a Guildford comeback led by Most Valuable Player E. J. Harrison and Daniel Gilbert, overhauled the Eagles for their first trophy of the season, after the league and cup double of last season. Harrison scored 10 of his 25 points in the closing quarter with Gilbert scoring 3 in the last minute to cement the trophy for the Heat. Lynard Stewart led all scorers in the match with 26 points, but this was not enough for Newcastle as Fabulous Flournoy's men went down in their second consecutive final after losing to Milton Keynes Lions in the BBL Cup final.

Statistics leaders

Monthly awards

Seasonal awards 

 Most Valuable Player: Lynard Stewart (Newcastle Eagles)
 Coach of the Year: Vince Macaulay-Razaq (Milton Keynes Lions)
 All-Star First Team:
 Lynard Stewart (Newcastle Eagles)
 Anthony Paez (Worcester Wolves)
 Andrew Lasker (Plymouth Raiders)
 Danny Gilbert (Guildford Heat)
 Robert Yanders (Scottish Rocks)
 All-Star Second Team:
 Tony Dorsey (Guildford Heat)
 Jayson Obazuaye (Cheshire Jets)
 Yorick Williams (Milton Keynes Lions)
 E.J. Morrison (Guildford Heat)
 James Life (Worcester Wolves)

References 

British Basketball League seasons
1
British